Dr. Zaven Khachaturian is a neuroscientist and Alzheimer's disease researcher.

Khachaturian previously worked for the National Institute on Aging. He was named the editor of the journal Alzheimer's & Dementia.

References

External links
Alzheimer's Association

American neuroscientists
Alzheimer's disease researchers
American people of Armenian descent
Living people
Year of birth missing (living people)